A regional election took place in Île-de-France on March 21 and March 28, 2004, along with all other regions. Jean-Paul Huchon (PS) was re-elected President for a six years term.

Election results

External links
 Minister of the Interior (France) 2004 official results

Politics of Île-de-France
 
2004 elections in France